Cecidophyes rouhollahi is a species of mite in the genus Cecidophyes. It is a plant parasite, or gall, found on cleaver (Galium aparine) and can be a potential biological control agent for false cleavers (Galium spurium), which is a noxious weed in many places.

References

External links
 Cecidophyes rouhollahi at faunaeur.org

Eriophyidae
Animals described in 1999
Arachnids of Asia
Arachnids of Europe